Nocardioides phosphati is a Gram-positive, non-spore-forming and non-motile bacterium from the genus Nocardioides which has been isolated from a phosphate mine in Yunnan, China.

References

External links
Type strain of Nocardioides phosphati at BacDive -  the Bacterial Diversity Metadatabase

 

phosphati
Bacteria described in 2017